In mathematics, a Lie algebra is semisimple if it is a direct sum of simple Lie algebras. (A simple Lie algebra is a non-abelian Lie algebra without any non-zero proper ideals).

Throughout the article, unless otherwise stated, a Lie algebra is a finite-dimensional Lie algebra over a field of characteristic 0. For such a Lie algebra , if nonzero, the following conditions are equivalent:
 is semisimple;
the Killing form, κ(x,y) = tr(ad(x)ad(y)),  is non-degenerate;
 has no non-zero abelian ideals;
 has no non-zero solvable ideals;

Significance 
The significance of semisimplicity comes firstly from the Levi decomposition, which states that every finite dimensional Lie algebra is the semidirect product of a solvable ideal (its radical) and a semisimple algebra. In particular, there is no nonzero Lie algebra that is both solvable and semisimple.

Semisimple Lie algebras have a very elegant classification, in stark contrast to solvable Lie algebras. Semisimple Lie algebras over an algebraically closed field of characteristic zero are completely classified by their root system, which are in turn classified by Dynkin diagrams. Semisimple algebras over non-algebraically closed fields can be understood in terms of those over the algebraic closure, though the classification is somewhat more intricate; see real form for the case of real semisimple Lie algebras, which were classified by Élie Cartan.

Further, the representation theory of semisimple Lie algebras is much cleaner than that for general Lie algebras. For example, the Jordan decomposition in a semisimple Lie algebra coincides with the Jordan decomposition in its representation; this is not the case for Lie algebras in general.

If  is semisimple, then . The study of the structure of  constitutes an important part of the representation theory for semisimple Lie algebras.

History 
The semisimple Lie algebras over the complex numbers were first classified by Wilhelm Killing (1888–90), though his proof lacked rigor. His proof was made rigorous by Élie Cartan (1894) in his Ph.D. thesis, who also classified semisimple real Lie algebras. This was subsequently refined, and the present classification by Dynkin diagrams was given by then 22-year-old Eugene Dynkin in 1947.

Basic properties 
Every ideal, quotient and product of semisimple Lie algebras is again semisimple.
The center of a semisimple Lie algebra  is trivial (since the center is an abelian ideal). In other words, the adjoint representation   is injective. Hence,  is an isomorphism. (This is a special case of Whitehead's lemma.)
As the adjoint representation is injective, a semisimple Lie algebra is a linear Lie algebra under the adjoint representation. This may lead to some ambiguity, as every Lie algebra is already linear with respect to some other vector space (Ado's theorem), although not necessarily via the adjoint representation.  But in practice, such ambiguity rarely occurs.
If  is a semisimple Lie algebra, then  (because  is semisimple and abelian).
A finite-dimensional Lie algebra  over a field k of characteristic zero is semisimple if and only if the base extension  is semisimple for each field extension . Thus, for example, a finite-dimensional real Lie algebra is semisimple if and only if its complexification is semisimple.

Jordan decomposition
Each endomorphism x of a finite-dimensional vector space over a field of characteristic zero can be decomposed uniquely into a semisimple (i.e., diagonalizable over the algebraic closure) and nilpotent part

such that s and n commute with each other.  Moreover, each of s and n is a polynomial in x.  This is the Jordan decomposition of x.

The above applies to the adjoint representation  of a semisimple Lie algebra . If , then the abstract Jordan decomposition states that x can be written uniquely as:

Moreover, if  commutes with x, then it commutes with both  as well.

is the Jordan decomposition of ρ(x) in the endomorphism algebra of the representation space. (This is proved as a consequence of Weyl's complete reducibility theorem; see Weyl's theorem on complete reducibility#Application: preservation of Jordan decomposition.)

Structure 
Let  be a (finite-dimensional) semisimple Lie algebra over an algebraically closed field of characteristic zero. The structure of  can be described by an adjoint action of a certain distinguished subalgebra on it, a Cartan subalgebra.
.
Then

The roots span  (since if , then  is the zero operator; i.e.,  is in the center, which is zero.)

The above then says that  is a root system.

Let , etc. Then the  elements  (called Chevalley generators) generate  as a Lie algebra.

.
This is a theorem of Serre. In particular, two semisimple Lie algebras are isomorphic if they have the same root system.

The implication of the axiomatic nature of a root system and Serre's theorem is that one can enumerate all possible root systems; hence, "all possible" semisimple Lie algebras (finite-dimensional over an algebraically closed field of characteristic zero).

The Weyl group is the group of linear transformations of  generated by the 's.

Example root space decomposition in sln(C)  
For  and the Cartan subalgebra  of diagonal matrices, define  by
,
Then the decomposition is given by

where

This decomposition of  has an associated root system:

sl2(C) 
For example, in  the decomposition is

and the associated root system is

sl3(C) 
In  the decomposition is

and the associated root system is given by

Examples 
Examples of semisimple Lie algebras, the classical Lie algebras, with notation coming from their Dynkin diagrams, are:
  , the special linear Lie algebra.
  , the odd-dimensional special orthogonal Lie algebra.
  , the symplectic Lie algebra.
  , the even-dimensional special orthogonal Lie algebra.
The restriction  in the  family is needed because  is one-dimensional and commutative and therefore not semisimple.

These Lie algebras are numbered so that n is the rank. Almost all of these semisimple Lie algebras are actually simple and the members of these families are almost all distinct, except for some collisions in small rank. These four families, together with five exceptions (E6, E7, E8, F4, and G2), are in fact the only simple Lie algebras over the complex numbers.

Classification 

Every semisimple Lie algebra over an algebraically closed field of characteristic 0 is a direct sum of simple Lie algebras (by definition), and the finite-dimensional simple Lie algebras fall in four families – An, Bn, Cn, and Dn – with five exceptions
E6, E7, E8, F4, and G2. Simple Lie algebras are classified by the connected Dynkin diagrams, shown on the right, while semisimple Lie algebras correspond to not necessarily connected Dynkin diagrams, where each component of the diagram corresponds to a summand of the decomposition of the semisimple Lie algebra into simple Lie algebras.

The classification proceeds by considering a Cartan subalgebra (see below) and its adjoint action on the Lie algebra. The root system of the action then both determines the original Lie algebra and must have a very constrained form, which can be classified by the Dynkin diagrams. See the section below describing Cartan subalgebras and root systems for more details.

The classification is widely considered one of the most elegant results in mathematics – a brief list of axioms yields, via a relatively short proof, a complete but non-trivial classification with surprising structure. This should be compared to the classification of finite simple groups, which is significantly more complicated.

If one starts numbering lower, the enumeration is redundant, and one has exceptional isomorphisms between simple Lie algebras, which are reflected in isomorphisms of Dynkin diagrams; the En can also be extended down, but below E6 are isomorphic to other, non-exceptional algebras.

Over a non-algebraically closed field, the classification is more complicated – one classifies simple Lie algebras over the algebraic closure, then for each of these, one classifies simple Lie algebras over the original field which have this form (over the closure). For example, to classify simple real Lie algebras, one classifies real Lie algebras with a given complexification, which are known as real forms of the complex Lie algebra; this can be done by Satake diagrams, which are Dynkin diagrams with additional data ("decorations").

Representation theory of semisimple Lie algebras 

Let  be a (finite-dimensional) semisimple Lie algebra over an algebraically closed field of characteristic zero. Then, as in #Structure,  where  is the root system.

Let V be a (possibly-infinite-dimensional) simple -module.

For applications, one is often interested in a finite-dimensional simple -module (a finite-dimensional irreducible representation). This is especially the case when  is the Lie algebra of a Lie group (or complexification of such), since, via the Lie correspondence, a Lie algebra representation can be integrated to a Lie group representation when the obstructions are overcome. The next criterion then addresses this need: by the positive Weyl chamber , we mean the convex cone  where  is a unique vector such that . The criterion then reads:
A linear functional  satisfying the above equivalent condition is called a dominant integral weight. Hence, in summary, there exists a bijection between the dominant integral weights and the equivalence classes of finite-dimensional simple -modules, the result known as the theorem of the highest weight. The character of a finite-dimensional simple module in turns is computed by the Weyl character formula.

The theorem due to Weyl says that, over a field of characteristic zero, every finite-dimensional module of a semisimple Lie algebra  is completely reducible; i.e., it is a direct sum of simple -modules. Hence, the above results then apply to finite-dimensional representations of a semisimple Lie algebra.

Real semisimple Lie algebra 
For a semisimple Lie algebra over a field that has characteristic zero but is not algebraically closed, there is no general structure theory like the one for those over an algebraically closed field of characteristic zero. But over the field of real numbers, there are still the structure results.

Let  be a finite-dimensional real semisimple Lie algebra and  the complexification of it (which is again semisimple). A real form is called a compact form if the Killing form on it is negative-definite; it is necessarily the Lie algebra of a compact Lie group (hence, the name).

Compact case 
Suppose  is a compact form and  a maximal abelian subspace.

For example, let  and take  the subspace of all diagonal matrices. Note . Then for each ,

where  is the matrix that has 1 on the -th spot and zero elsewhere. Hence, each root  is of the form  and the root space decomposition is the decomposition of matrices:

Noncompact case 
Suppose  is not necessarily a compact form (i.e., the signature of the Killing form is not all negative). For example, if  and  the negative transpose, then .

Let  be a maximal abelian subspace. By repeating the arguments for the algebraically closed base field, one obtains the decomposition (called the restricted root space decomposition):

where
 for any linear functional ; in particular,
.
Moreover,  is a root system but not necessarily reduced one (i.e., it can happen  are both roots).

The case of sl(n,C)
Since  has dimension , we see that  has rank .

If  is a diagonal matrix with diagonal entries , then we have
.
.
After identifying  with its dual, the roots become the vectors  in the space of -tuples that sum to zero.

Generalizations 

Semisimple Lie algebras admit certain generalizations. Firstly, many statements that are true for semisimple Lie algebras are true more generally for reductive Lie algebras. Many properties of semisimple Lie algebras depend only on reducibility.

Many properties of complex semisimple/reductive Lie algebras are true not only for semisimple/reductive Lie algebras over algebraically closed fields, but more generally for split semisimple/reductive Lie algebras over other fields: semisimple/reductive Lie algebras over algebraically closed fields are always split, but over other fields this is not always the case. Split Lie algebras have essentially the same representation theory as semisimple Lie algebras over algebraically closed fields, for instance, the splitting Cartan subalgebra playing the same role as the Cartan subalgebra plays over algebraically closed fields.

Semisimple and reductive groups
A connected Lie group is called semisimple if its Lie algebra is a semisimple Lie algebra, i.e. a direct sum of simple Lie algebras. It is called reductive if its Lie algebra is a direct sum of simple and trivial (one-dimensional) Lie algebras. Reductive groups occur naturally as symmetries of a number of mathematical objects in algebra, geometry, and physics. For example, the group  of symmetries of an n-dimensional real vector space (equivalently, the group of invertible matrices) is reductive.

See also
Lie algebra
Root system
Lie algebra representation
Compact group
Simple Lie group
Borel subalgebra
Jacobson–Morozov theorem

References

 
 .

 .
 

.
 .

Properties of Lie algebras